Katherine "Kat" Flores (born October 28, 1987), known professionally as Tatu Baby, is an American tattoo artist and reality television personality. She was a contestant on Ink Master season 2 in 2012, where she placed fourth, followed by season 3 of the same show in 2013, where she placed third. She currently stars as a main cast member in Cartel Crew (2019–present), another reality television show based on people who have connections to drug cartels. Tatu Baby has remained active as a tattoo artist in Miami, Florida.

Early life
Katherine "Tatu Baby" Flores was born October 28, 1987 in Miami, Florida to Colombian parents. Tatu Baby's father, a drug kingpin in Queens, New York, was killed when Tatu Baby was four years old. She does not reveal the name of her father on Cartel Crew; Distractify called him "infamous" and the Telegraph stated he was a "colleague of Pablo Escobar", the Colombian drug lord. After her father died, Tatu Baby's mother wanted to get out of the drug business for the safety of her family.

Career
Tatu Baby started tattooing professionally at age 19. She names Nikko Hurtado, Jose Lopez, and Steve Butcher as inspirations. With six years of experience, she got cast in the reality tattooing competition show Ink Master for their second season. In doing so, Devon Preston from Inked Magazine stated Tatu Baby "...helped to open doors for thousands of women pursuing careers in tattooing." She made it fourth in the competition and was invited back for the third season of the show. Screen Rant writer Gabriela Torres ranked Tatu Baby's tattoo depicting a Hindu goddess with eight arms atop a lion during season 3 as the seventh worst tattoo of the series overall, writing, "The result was less than fascinating. Tatu Baby's lion ended up looking more like a cartoon instead of a majestic jungle cat." For the finale of season 3, she designed and tattooed a wolf and Native American woman above a tomahawk as a backpiece. She placed third in the show overall.

After Ink Master season 3 ended, Tatu Baby opened her own shop, called Till the End Tattoos in Miami, Florida. Teen Vogue wrote, "The studio has a range of artists who specialize in custom designs, black-and-gray work and realism, so even if you can't get Tatu Baby herself (she's definitely in high demand), you're pretty much guaranteed to find someone else you're into." 

In 2019, Tatu Baby was cast as a main cast member in the VH1 series Cartel Crew, which follows the lives of family members connected to drug lords and cartels. She continued on the series for their second season, also released in 2019. 

In August 2020, Tatu Baby tattooed Puerto Rican rapper Anuel AA and Colombian singer Karol G. Anuel AA got "Fear God" above his right eyebrow with a cross beneath it, while Karol G got a butterfly on her right arm and "+57", and "1991" on her right hand.  Other celebrities Tatu Baby has tattooed include American singers Dalex, Jason Derulo, Luis Fonsi, and Rick Ross; American former professional basketball player Dwyane Wade; Mexican boxer Canelo Álvarez; and others. Tess Adamakos of Inked Magazine named Tatu Baby one of the 10 leading names in the tattoo world. VH1 wrote, "The talented Tatu Baby is one of the top Latina tattoo artists in the U.S."

Personal life
Tatu Baby has one child with Eddie Soto, a son named Deniro Roman Soto. As of 2020, she is unmarried.

Tatu Baby has a number of tattoos herself. She has been tattooed by Billy Vegas, Shane O'Neill, David Gonzalez, Johnny Quintana (right upper arm), Boog (masquerade girl on the outer forearm), Jon Mesa (rose and diamond on the right side of her neck), Hector Arriaga (lower left arm), Mike Dargas (left hand), and Jime Litwalk (owl behind her right thigh).

Filmography

References

External links
 

American tattoo artists
Living people
1987 births
Participants in American reality television series
Ink Master
People from Miami
American people of Colombian descent